Jummapatti railway station is a railway station on the –Matheran railway line of the Matheran Hill Railway. The station is about 4.8 km from Neral railway station.

References

Railway stations in Raigad district
Mountain railways in India